The Australian Cup is a greyhound racing competition held annually at The Meadows in Broadmeadows, Victoria, Australia. The event was inaugurated in 1958 at North Melbourne Oval and is organised by the Melbourne Greyhound Racing Association (MGRA). The race moved with the MGRA and when the North Melbourne track closed it switched to Olympic Park but when Olympic Park closed it was held at Sandown Park for two years in 1997 and 1998, while the club established its new home at the Meadows.

The Cup is the highlight of the Australia Cup Carnival and it is worth $300,000 to the winner. The Australian Cup is one of the biggest races in Australia for greyhound racing. Australian Cup Finalists must win their heat and their semi-final in order to progress to the Australia Cup Final.

Past winners

Notes
 not held in 1963

References 

Greyhound racing competitions in Australia
Greyhound racing in Australia
Sports competitions in Melbourne